Grov is a village in Stord municipality in Vestland county, Norway.  The village is located on the island of Stord, about a 7-minute drive north of the town of Leirvik.  Grov lies along the European route E39 highway and the Langenuen strait, overlooking the island of Huglo across the strait.  Grov is known for its fantastic natural surroundings and peaceful life by the sea.

References

Villages in Vestland
Stord